John T. Sewell ( – 28 April 1955) was a professional rugby league footballer who played in the 1940s and 1950s.

Playing career
Sewell was transferred from Dewsbury to Batley in November 1949, he played his last match for Batley, against Widnes at Naughton Park, Widnes on Saturday 24 March 1951, he sustained a head injury in the first-half of this match, and complained of a headache at half-time, but completed the match, however on the return journey by motor coach he became unconscious, and later suffered paralysis down one-side of his body, and aphasia (Loss of the ability to produce and/or comprehend language), and was subsequently transferred from Staincliffe General Hospital (near his home on Willians Road (off Halifax Road), Dewsbury) to Leeds General Infirmary, 4-years later he subsequently died from complications arising from his injury.

References

External links

 Search for "Sewell" at rugbyleagueproject.org

1920s births
1955 deaths
Batley Bulldogs players
Dewsbury Rams players
English rugby league players
Place of birth missing
Rugby league props
Sport deaths in England